This page includes a list of biblical proper names that start with G in English transcription. Some of the names are given with a proposed etymological meaning. For further information on the names included on the list, the reader may consult the sources listed below in the References and External Links.

A – B – C – D – E – F – G – H – I – J – K – L – M – N – O – P – Q – R – S – T – U – V – Y – Z

G 

Gaal
Gaash
Gabbai
Gabbatha
Gabriel
Gad
Gadarenes
Gaddi
Gaddiel
Gaius
Galal
Galatia
Galeed
Galilee
Gallim
Gallio
Gamaliel
Gammadims
Gamul
Gareb
Garmites
Gatam
Gath
Gath-rimmon
Gaza
Gazer
Gazez
Gazzam
Geba
Gebal
Geber
Gebim
Gedaliah
Geder
Gederothaim
Gehazi
Geliloth
Gemalli
Gemariah
Gennesaret
Genesis
Genubath
Gera
Gerar
Gergesenes
Gerizim
Gershom
Gershon
Geshur, Geshuri
Gether
Gethsemane
Geuel
Gezer
Giah
Gibbar
Gibbethon
Gibeah
Gibeon
Giddel
Gideon
 Gideoni
Gihon
Gilalai
Gilboa
Gilead
Gilgal
Giloh
Gimzo, fertile in sycamores a place fertile in sycamores
Ginath, Ginnetho, protection
Girgashite
Gispa
Gittah-hepher
Gittaim
Gittites
Goath
Gob
Gog
Golan
Golgotha
Goliath
Gomer
Gomorrah
Goshen
Gozan
Gudgodah
Guni
Gur
Gur-baal

References

Comay, Joan, Who's Who in the Old Testament, Oxford University Press, 1971,  
Lockyer, Herbert, All the men of the Bible, Zondervan Publishing House (Grand Rapids, Michigan), 1958
Lockyer, Herbert, All the women of the Bible, Zondervan Publishing 1988, 
Lockyer, Herbert, All the Divine Names and Titles in the Bible, Zondervan Publishing 1988,  
Tischler, Nancy M., All things in the Bible: an encyclopedia of the biblical world , Greenwood Publishing, Westport, Conn. : 2006

Inline references
 

G